55th New York Film Critics Circle Awards
January 14, 1990

Best Film: 
 My Left Foot 
The 55th New York Film Critics Circle Awards honored the best filmmaking of 1989. The winners were announced on 18 December 1989 and the awards were given on 14 January 1990.

Winners
Best Actor:
Daniel Day-Lewis - My Left Foot
Runners-up: Tom Cruise - Born on the Fourth of July and Morgan Freeman - Driving Miss Daisy
Best Actress:
Michelle Pfeiffer - The Fabulous Baker Boys
Runners-up: Jessica Tandy - Driving Miss Daisy and Andie MacDowell - Sex, Lies, and Videotape
Best Cinematography:
Ernest R. Dickerson - Do the Right Thing
Runners-up: Michael Ballhaus - The Fabulous Baker Boys and Jeff Preiss - Let's Get Lost
Best Director:
Paul Mazursky - Enemies, a Love Story
Runners-up: Brian De Palma - Casualties of War and Bruce Beresford - Driving Miss Daisy
Best Documentary:
Roger & Me
Thelonious Monk: Straight, No Chaser and Let's Get Lost
Best Film:
My Left Foot
Runners-up: Enemies, a Love Story and The Fabulous Baker Boys
Best Foreign Language Film:
Story of Women (Une affaire de femmes) • France
Runners-up: Chocolat • France and Camille Claudel • France
Best New Director:
Kenneth Branagh - Henry V
Runners-up: Steve Kloves - The Fabulous Baker Boys and Jim Sheridan - My Left Foot
Best Screenplay:
Gus Van Sant and Daniel Yost - Drugstore Cowboy
Runners-up: Steven Soderbergh - Sex, Lies, and Videotape and Steve Kloves - The Fabulous Baker Boys
Best Supporting Actor:
Alan Alda - Crimes and Misdemeanors
Runners-up: Denzel Washington - Glory and Marlon Brando - A Dry White Season
Best Supporting Actress:
Lena Olin - Enemies, a Love Story
Runners-up: Brenda Fricker - My Left Foot and Laura San Giacomo - Sex, Lies, and Videotape

References

External links
1989 Awards
IMDb page

1989
New York Film Critics Circle Awards, 1989
New York Film Critics Circle Awards
New York Film Critics Circle Awards
New York Film Critics Circle Awards
New York Film Critics Circle Awards